Farzad Kamangar (– 9 May 2010) was a 32-year-old Iranian Kurdish teacher, poet, journalist, human rights activist and social worker from the city of Kamyaran, Iran who was executed on 9 May 2010.

The Accusations and the Courts 
Kamangar was prosecuted on charges of Mohareb "enmity towards God". An Islamic Revolutionary Court sentenced Kamangar to death on February 25, 2008 on charges against national security including being a member of PJAK and accusations of active participation in several bombing attacks among which was the 2006 explosion in the Iran-Turkey gas export pipeline. According to his lawyer, Khalil Bahramian, "Nothing in Kamangar’s judicial files and records demonstrates any links to the charges brought against him."

Bahramian, the lawyer, who was present during the closed-door court hearing, described it as 
“Lasting no more than five minutes, with the Judge issuing his sentence without any explanation and then promptly leaving the room. ... I have seen absolutely zero evidence presented against Kamangar. In my forty years in the legal profession, I have never witnessed such a prosecution.” For this denial, Kamangar was repeatedly tortured. Amnesty International reports that Kamangar was repeatedly beaten, flogged, and electrocuted, and that he suffered from spasms in his arms and legs as a result of the torture.

The Supreme Court officially confirmed Kamangar's death sentence on July 11, 2008.

Kamangar was one of the six political prisoners highlighted in the International Campaign for Human Rights in Iran's 18 September 2008 document "Rights Crisis Escalates, Faces and Cases from Ahmadinejad's Crackdown"

Kamangar participated in the hunger strike to protest the execution of Ehsan Fatahian.

Human Rights Organizations' Reaction 
Amnesty International, Education International, and other teachers' and human rights organizations have called for Kamangar's sentence to be commuted.

Kamangar's Notes 
Kamangar in a piece describes his time at the prison as follows:
"...I spent close to a month in solitary isolation, at the end of the first floor, in section 113 [of the prison]. It had a horrible stench. During this period I was not allowed to have visits nor telephone calls with any member of my family. During the 3 months of solitary confinement I was not allowed to go out in the free air. After enduring these months they moved me to a bigger cell, cell number 10, a cell intended for several persons, and I spent close to two months there. Still I was not allowed to have any contact with a lawyer or my family...."

A part of Kamangar's letter "Be Strong Comrades":
"Is it possible to carry the heavy burden of being a teacher and be responsible for spreading the seeds of knowledge and still be silent? Is it possible to see the lumps in the throats of the students and witness their thin and malnourished faces and keep quiet? Is it possible to be in the year of no justice and fairness and fail to teach the H for Hope and E for Equality, even if such teachings land you in Evin Prison or result in your death?"

a quote from Farzad's letter to his students:

"Boys of the land of the sun, I know you cannot sit, sing, and laugh with your classmates anymore, because after the tragedy of becoming a man, you have to face the grief of having to “earn bread”. But Remember to not turn your backs on your poems, your songs, your Leyla’s and your dreams. Teach your children to be offspring of “poems and rain” of their land; for the present and tomorrow. I leave you to the wind and sunshine so that, in the near future, you will sing lessons of love and sincerity to our motherland.

Your childhood friend, playmate, and teacher"

See also
Ehsan Fatahian
Islamic Revolutionary Court
Ministry of Intelligence (Iran)

References

1970s births
2010 deaths
Iranian activists
21st-century executions by Iran
Executed Iranian people
Iranian Kurdish people
Iranian torture victims
People executed by Iran by hanging